Hiram Boardman Conibear (September 5, 1871 – September 9, 1917) was an American football and rowing coach. He served as head football coach the University of Montana from 1903 to 1904, compiling a record of 5–7. Conibear was head rowing coach at the University of Washington from 1907 to 1917, coaching both the men's and women's rowing teams. He developed the distinctive style that became known as the Conibear stroke that "had an effect on the sport that lasted for 30 years".

Biography
Conibear was born on September 5, 1871, in Mineral, Illinois to Edward H. Conibear and Amelia Boardman of England.  He later graduated from the University of Illinois.

Conibear began his coaching career in cycling. In 1906, working as athletics trainer at the University of Washington, he accepted the post of rowing crew coach even though he had no rowing experience and knew nothing about the sport.

Experiments convinced him that the traditional Oxford style of rowing, involving a long stroke, was both unsound and uncomfortable, and he developed the new, shorter style with which his name became associated.

Under his coaching the university crew became, in 1913, the first Western crew to compete by invitation in the Intercollegiate Rowing Association regatta in Poughkeepsie, New York, and Washington crew members went on to achieve success at subsequent regattas and at national and Olympic level using the technique developed by Conibear.

Conibear died from a fall from a plum tree at his home in Seattle, Washington, on September 9, 1917 at age 46.

Legacy
 Conibear Rowing Club
 Conibear Shellhouse

Head coaching record

Football

See also
 History of rowing

References

1871 births
1917 deaths
Illinois Fighting Illini track and field coaches
Montana Grizzlies football coaches
Washington Huskies men's rowing coaches
University of Illinois Urbana-Champaign alumni
People from Bureau County, Illinois
Accidental deaths from falls
Accidental deaths in Washington (state)
Washington Huskies women's rowing coaches